Carlos Wilhelm García Ambrosiani (born 17 January 1993), known as Carlos García, is a Swedish footballer  who plays for IK Brage in Superettan.

Biography
García started his youth career at Stockholm, capital of Sweden, for Ängby and then Djurgården. On 22 January 2010 he was signed by Italian football giants Juventus for €250,000, plus €200,000 bonuses. In 2012, he was signed by Perugia in a temporary deal.

Parma
On 2 September 2013, García was sold from Juventus to Parma for €500,000. in a 2-year contract. García immediately left for Danish club Brønshøj in a temporary deal.

On 26 February 2014 García returned to Sweden for J-Södra.

Huddinge
On 9 July 2015 García signed a contract with Huddinge on a free transfer.

Personal life
Born in Sweden, García is of Nicaraguan descent

References

External links
 AIC profile (data by football.it) 
 

1993 births
Living people
Footballers from Stockholm
Swedish footballers
Swedish people of Nicaraguan descent
Djurgårdens IF Fotboll players
Juventus F.C. players
A.C. Perugia Calcio players
Parma Calcio 1913 players
Brønshøj Boldklub players
Jönköpings Södra IF players
IK Brage players
Serie C players
Superettan players
Association football defenders
Swedish expatriate footballers
Swedish expatriate sportspeople in Italy
Swedish expatriate sportspeople in Denmark
Expatriate footballers in Italy
Expatriate men's footballers in Denmark